Kunjikoonan may refer to:

Kunjikoonan (1989 film), an Indian Malayalam language film directed by Mankada Ravi Varma
Kunjikoonan (2002 film), an Indian Malayalam language film directed by Sasi Shanker